Odontocorynus is a genus of flower weevils in the family of beetles known as Curculionidae. There are 16 described species in Odontocorynus. Now taxonomists place it in the tribe Madarini.

Species 
 Odontocorynus calcarifer Prena, 2008
 Odontocorynus creperus Boheman, 1844
 Odontocorynus falsus (LeConte, 1876)
 Odontocorynus histriculus Casey, 1920
 Odontocorynus larvatus (Boheman, 1844)
 Odontocorynus latiscapus Champion, 1908
 Odontocorynus luteogramma Prena, 2008
 Odontocorynus nunume Prena, 2008
 Odontocorynus procerus Prena, 2008
 Odontocorynus pulverulentus (Casey, 1892)
 Odontocorynus salebrosus (Casey, 1892)
 Odontocorynus subvittatus Casey, 1920
 Odontocorynus suturaflava Champion, 1908
 Odontocorynus tectus Champion, 1908
 Odontocorynus townsendi (Casey, 1920)
 Odontocorynus umbellae (Fabricius, 1801)

References

External links 

 

Baridinae
Articles created by Qbugbot